John Hornby (19 August 1810 – 5 December 1892) was a British Conservative politician.

Hornby was elected Conservative MP for Blackburn at the 1841 general election and held the seat until 1852.

References

External links
 

1810 births
1892 deaths
Conservative Party (UK) MPs for English constituencies
UK MPs 1841–1847
UK MPs 1847–1852